Myo Myint  (25 February 1944 – 15 May 2013) was a Burmese orthopaedic surgeon. He served as the president of the Myanmar Medical Association (MMA) from 1999 to 2005, and the rector of the University of Medicine 1, Yangon from 1998 to 2007. In 1977, Myo Myint became the first surgeon in Burma to successfully replant a totally amputated hand. From 1988 to 1990, he served as the head of the University of Medicine 2, Yangon's orthopaedics department. Myo Myint was born in Yegyi, Pathein District on 25 February 1944 during the Japanese occupation.

References

Burmese orthopaedic surgeons
1944 births
University of Medicine 1, Yangon alumni
2013 deaths